Clifton Alexander Hawkins (July 2, 1937 – September 12, 2017) was an American football player who played professionally as a running back in the National Football League (NFL) for the Baltimore Colts and Atlanta Falcons. He excelled as a special teams player and was a co-captain with the Colts, the first special teams player with this distinction.

Early years
Born in Welch, West Virginia, Hawkins graduated from South Charleston High School in 1955.

College career
From  Hawkins played college football at South Carolina; he rushed for 1,491 yards and was voted the Atlantic Coast Conference (ACC) player of the year as a senior and was a third-team All-American.

NFL career
Hawkins was the thirteenth player selected in the second round of the 1959 NFL Draft, but was released in mid-September by first-year head coach Vince Lombardi of the  The first four rounds of the draft were held in early December 1958, nearly two months before Lombardi was hired. Hawkins was picked up by Baltimore Colts, and they repeated as NFL champions his rookie season, defeating the New York Giants  in the title game in Baltimore.

In his final season in 1968, Hawkins was special-teams captain for the Colts in Super Bowl III, in which the heavily favored Colts were upset  by Joe Namath and the New York Jets on January 12, 1969. During the 1968 season, the Colts had a record of  under head coach Don Shula, although Hawkins' playing time was limited.

During a nine-year NFL career, Hawkins rushed for 10 touchdowns, and his 129 pass receptions included 12 touchdown passes. He also returned punts and kickoffs.

Hawkins acquired the nickname "Captain Who" prior to a Baltimore Colts game with the Chicago Bears, when the team captains were being introduced to each other before the game.  Bears' Hall of Fame linebacker Dick Butkus responded to the official's reference to "Captain Hawkins" by blurting out "Captain Who?"

Broadcaster 
After retiring as a player, Hawkins worked as a color commentator for Falcons radio; for TVS' Thursday night World Football League (WFL) telecasts and CBS' NFL telecasts throughout the 1970s.

1977 NFC Championship Broadcast
In 1977, the NFC Championship Game between the Minnesota Vikings and the Dallas Cowboys was televised by CBS and covered by play-by-play announcer Vin Scully with Hawkins as color commentator. 

Hawkins said that he hoped that the Cowboys would win, because "I've always been a Cowboy fan."

At one point, 35-year-old Dallas quarterback Roger Staubach was shown jogging onto the field, and Hawkins commented to Scully, "Roger runs like a sissy, doesn't he?" To which Scully responded, "Did you wear a helmet when you played?". 

Hawkins was arrested during a traffic stop a few days after the championship game, and later was fired by CBS.

Death
Hawkins died at HarborChase Assisted Living and Memory Care in Columbia, South Carolina on September 12, 2017, at the age of 80.

References

External links
 

1937 births
2017 deaths
American football running backs
American sports announcers
Atlanta Falcons announcers
Atlanta Falcons players
Baltimore Colts players
South Carolina Gamecocks football players
National Football League announcers
World Football League announcers
South Charleston High School alumni
People from South Charleston, West Virginia
People from Welch, West Virginia
Players of American football from West Virginia